is a Japanese retired badminton player from Tonami Transportation badminton team. He competed at the 2012 London and 2016 Rio Olympics. He also competed in four Asian Games from 2002 to 2014.

Career
In 2007 he won the Japanese National Championships in men's singles, and 7 international tournaments: the Bahrain Satellite Badminton Tournament, the Banuinvest International Championships, the Osaka International Challenge, the Israel International, the Mauritius International, the Victorian International and the Italian International. At the 2012 Summer Olympics, he reached the quarter-finals of the men's singles, losing to Lin Dan. In 2016, he did not advance to the knock-out stage after placing second in the group stage. He beat Petr Koukal of the Czech Republic, but was defeated by Rajiv Ouseph of Great Britain.

In 2017, he announced his retirement from the international badminton event. He ranked as high as No.6 in his career.

Awards
In May 2012 he received the People's Honour Award from Hokuto City, and in 2013, received a Sports Award at the Toyama Shinbun Culture, Performing Arts and Sports Awards Ceremony.

Achievements

Asia Championships
Men's Singles

BWF Grand Prix 
The BWF Grand Prix has two level such as Grand Prix and Grand Prix Gold. It is a series of badminton tournaments, sanctioned by Badminton World Federation (BWF) since 2007.

Men's Singles

 BWF Grand Prix Gold tournament
 BWF Grand Prix tournament

BWF International Challenge/Series 
Men's singles

Men's doubles

  BWF International Challenge tournament
  BWF International Series tournament

References

External links 
 

Living people
Japanese male badminton players
1982 births
Sportspeople from Hokkaido
Badminton players at the 2012 Summer Olympics
Badminton players at the 2016 Summer Olympics
Olympic badminton players of Japan
Badminton players at the 2002 Asian Games
Badminton players at the 2006 Asian Games
Badminton players at the 2010 Asian Games
Badminton players at the 2014 Asian Games
Asian Games competitors for Japan